Grono is a surname. Notable people with the surname include:

John Grono ( 1763–1847), Welsh-born Australian settler, sailor, whaler, and farmer
Nick Grono (born 1966), Australian human rights campaigner